Sayed Rased Turzo (born 30 September 1990) is a Bangladeshi international footballer. He made one appearance for the Bangladesh national football team in 2016. He also represented Sheikh Russel KC in three matches of the 2017–18 Bangladesh Premier League. He was named in Bangladesh's squad for the 2019 AFC Asian Cup qualification tournament.

References

External links 
 
 

Living people
1990 births
Bangladeshi footballers
Bangladesh international footballers
Association football forwards
Sheikh Russel KC players